The 2nd congressional district of Tennessee is a congressional district in East Tennessee. It has been represented by Republican Tim Burchett since January 2019.

Current boundaries
The district is located in East Tennessee and borders Kentucky and Virginia to the north and North Carolina to the south.

It currently covers all of Blount, Claiborne, Grainger, Knox, Loudon and Union counties, along with the northern half of Campbell County and a sliver of Jefferson County.

Characteristics
The district is based in Knoxville, and is largely coextensive with that city's metropolitan area.
 
The area is known for being the home of the flagship campus for the University of Tennessee, hosting the 1982 World's Fair, and for being the headquarters for the Tennessee Valley Authority, Ruby Tuesday, and Pilot Flying J.

The 2nd is similar in character to the neighboring 1st, and has long been one of the safest districts in the nation for the Republican Party. No Democrat has represented the district since 1855, and Republicans have held the district continuously since 1859—the longest time any party has held any district. The Democrats waged some competitive races in the district during the 1930s. However, they have not put up a substantive candidate in the district since 1964, and have only managed 40 percent of the vote twice since then.

Most of its residents supported the Union over the Confederacy during the American Civil War; it was one of four districts whose congressmen did not resign when Tennessee seceded from the Union in 1861. The area's residents immediately identified with the Republicans after hostilities ceased. Much of that sentiment was derived from the region's economic base of small-scale farming, with little or no use for slavery; thus, voters were mostly indifferent or hostile to the concerns of plantation owners and other landed interests farther west in the state, who aligned themselves with the Democratic Party. This loyalty has persisted through good times and bad ever since, despite the vast ideological changes in both political parties since that time.

The few Democratic pockets in the district are located in Knoxville, which occasionally elects Democratic mayors and occasionally sends Democrats to the state legislature. However, they are no match for the overwhelming Republican bent of the rest of Knox County, as well as the more suburban and rural areas. For example, Blount and Grainger counties are among the few counties in the country to have never supported a Democrat for president.

This district traditionally gives its congressmen very long tenures in Washington, electing some of the few truly senior Southern Republican congressmen before the 1950s. Since 1909, only seven people (not counting caretakers) have represented the district–Richard W. Austin, J. Will Taylor, John Jennings Jr., Howard Baker Sr., John Duncan Sr., Jimmy Duncan, and Burchett. All six of Burchett's predecessors have served at least ten years in Congress, with Taylor and the Duncans holding the seat for at least twenty years.

Election results from presidential races 
Results Under Old Lines (2013-2023)

History
Although the district has taken many forms over the years, it has been centered on Knoxville since 1853.

During the Civil War era, the area was represented in Congress by Horace Maynard. Maynard switched parties many times, but was pro-Union, and did not resign from Congress when Tennessee seceded. Maynard entered Congress in 1857 (four years before the outbreak of the Civil War), but did not leave entirely until 1875 (ten years after the Civil War ended).

For a short period in the 1870s, the area was represented by Jacob M. Thornburgh. For the 44th United States Congress, Thornburgh was the only Republican in the Tennessee delegation.

Following Thornburgh's retirement, the district chose former Union colonel Leonidas C. Houk, who served until his death in 1891, upon which he was succeeded by his son John.

In late 1893, John faced a primary challenge from Henry R. Gibson. Gibson was chosen following this narrow and divisive primary, then went on to serve in Congress for ten years.

Gibson did not seek re-election in 1904 and was succeeded by Nathan W. Hale, who served only two terms.

Similar in character to the Houk/Gibson primary in 1893, Hale faced a divisive primary with eventual winner Richard W. Austin in 1908.

Ten years later, Austin himself was defeated for the Republican nomination, being edged out by former state Republican chairman J. Will Taylor. Taylor managed to serve for twenty years until his death in 1939.

In a special election to fill the vacancy left by Taylor's death, the district elected former judge John Jennings, Jr. Jennings' tenure nearly perfectly coincided with the 1940s decade.

In 1950, Jennings was defeated in primary by former district attorney Howard Baker, Sr. Baker served for thirteen years until his death in 1964, where he was succeeded by his widow Irene who did not seek re-election.

In the 1964 election, the district chose Knoxville mayor John Duncan, Sr. Duncan served for 23 years before his death in summer 1988.

Following Duncan's death, the district elected his son, Jimmy. The younger Duncan served for just over thirty years from late 1988 until his successor was sworn in early January 2019.

Upon Jimmy Duncan's retirement, the district chose outgoing Knox County mayor Tim Burchett, who has served since January 2019.

List of members representing the district

Recent election results

2012

2014

2016

2018

2020

2022

See also

Tennessee's congressional districts
List of United States congressional districts

Notes

References

 Congressional Biographical Directory of the United States 1774–present

02
East Tennessee